Rosalba de la Cruz Requena (born 4 April 1954) is a Mexican politician affiliated with the PRI. She currently serves as Deputy of the LXII Legislature of the Mexican Congress representing Tamaulipas.

References

1954 births
Living people
Politicians from Tamaulipas
Institutional Revolutionary Party politicians
Women members of the Chamber of Deputies (Mexico)
21st-century Mexican politicians
21st-century Mexican women politicians
Autonomous University of Tamaulipas alumni
Deputies of the LXII Legislature of Mexico
Members of the Chamber of Deputies (Mexico) for Tamaulipas